Sami al-Oraydi (also: al-Uraydi) is a senior sharia official for the al-Qaeda affiliated Hurras al-Din and Guardians of Religion Organization, who was the chief religious authority for al-Nusra Front and the group's former second-in-command.

Biography
Sami al-Oraydi was born in Amman, Jordan, in 1973, and received his bachelor's degree in religious studies from the University of Jordan. In 1997 he received a master's degree from the same university in Hadith studies and, in 2001, completed his PhD in the same subject. He has written a number of books about the 14th century scholar Ibn Taymiyyah.

Al-Oraydi was influenced by the teachings of Syrian jihadist Abu Musab al-Suri, who fought against the Syrian government in the 1970s and '80s.

Syrian Civil War

Al-Oraydi was a member of the al-Nusra Front. He acted as the group's chief sharia authority and reportedly served as the group's second-in-command. He was previously al-Nusra's second highest sharia authority under former religious leader and military commander Abu Maria Al-Qahtani. Al-Oraydi was promoted over al-Qahtani after the Islamic State of Iraq and the Levant (ISIL) overran Nusra Front positions in eastern Syria in 2014.

He had used social media to release sermons and declarations on behalf of the Nusra Front. He maintained a Twitter account under the handle @sami_oride and reportedly tweeted that the "ideal" jihadist is a moral individual watched by God and the public. Al-Oraidi has also used social media to attack ISIL, particularly after the group declared its caliphate in June 2014. Al-Oraydi said ISIL spokesman Abu Mohammad al-Adnani "does not know what comes out of his head." He also referred to ISIL's leaders as "Muslim killers." He declared war on ISIL in a December 2014 sermon.

Al-Oraydi has accused ISIL of being Kharijites and has denounced the group for being too extreme, saying in an audio released in 2014 that "Jihad has taught me that leniency in dealing with extremists and Kharijites is disregard for the blood of the Sunnis and the Mujaheddin. Every Jihad arena they enter, they shed the blood of the mujahideen."

After the formation of Tahrir al-Sham, al-Oraydi left the group, along with another senior al-Nusra leader, and was later arrested by HTS with several other Pro-al-Qaeda elements from the group; the arrests were condemned by ISIL. His resignation was confirmed by Abu Muhammad al-Maqdisi. al-Oraydi joined the shura council of the Guardians of Religion Organization in February 2018.

The U.S. Department of State's Rewards for Justice Program is offering up to $5 million reward for information on his whereabouts.

See also
List of fugitives from justice who disappeared

References

1973 births
People from Amman
University of Jordan alumni
Living people
Al-Qaeda leaders
Fugitives
Jordanian al-Qaeda members
Jordanian Sunni Muslims
Al-Nusra Front members
Salafi jihadists
Jordanian Qutbists